An air liaison officer is generally an air force official acting as an intermediary between the air force they represent and another organization, although this role can vary based on country.

United Kingdom
In World War II,  air liaison officers were senior officers of the Royal Air Force posted within a separate foreign or domestic military or civil service, providing communication between that service and the Royal Air Force.

Some Air Liaison Officers
 Squadron Leader William Palstra (killed on R101)
 Air Vice Marshal Stanley James (Jimmy) Goble
 Air Vice Marshal David Vaughan Carnegie
 Wing Commander Hugh Gordon Malcolm VC
 Field Marshal Sir Francis Wogan Festing
 Air Vice Marshal Henry Meyrick Cave-Browne-Cave
 Air Vice Marshal Henry Neilson Wrigley

United States

References

History of the Royal Air Force